Selina Anne Mills (1767 – May 1831) was a school teacher who bought a girls school in Park Street, Bristol in December 1789 with her sisters Mary and Fanny, from Mary, Elizabeth, Sarah and Patty More, the sisters of Hannah More.

Family life
Mills was the daughter of the Bristol printer and bookseller, Thomas Mills. She went on to marry Zachary Macaulay in August 1799. The couple had been introduced to each other by Hannah More on 26 August 1799, who later, with her sister, Patty, attempted to frustrate their courtship. They settled in Clapham, Surrey. They had nine children, including:
 Thomas Babington Macaulay (1800–1859) the historian, poet and politician.
 Selina Macaulay (1802–1858)
 Jean Macaulay (1804–1830)
 Rev. John Macaulay (1805–1874)
 Henry William Macaulay (1806–1839)
 Frances Macaulay (1808–1888)
 Hannah More Macaulay (1810–1873) who married Sir Charles Trevelyan and was the mother of Sir George Otto Trevelyan
 Margaret Macaulay (1812–1834)
 Charles Zachary Macaulay (1814–1886)

The Bristol elopement

Mills got caught up in the elopement of Clementina Clerke, a wealthy heiress being educated at the school. Rowlandson's caricature is inaccurate: an accomplice posing as a servant delivered a letter to Selina purporting to come from Clerke's guardian requesting that Clementina take the carriage provided in order to go and see him immediately. Selina and Mary saw Miss Clerke into the carriage, but only later realised they had been duped.

References

1767 births
1831 deaths
English evangelists
Women evangelists
Schoolteachers from Somerset
English women educators
Selina
18th-century English educators
19th-century English educators
19th-century women educators
19th-century English women
18th-century English women
18th-century English people